The Utah Commercial and Savings Bank Building, at 22 East 100 South in Salt Lake City, Utah, United States, was designed by Richard K.A. Kletting and was built in 1888. Also known as the Village Brownstone Building, it is a Richardsonian Romanesque style building.

Description
The building is important for its architecture and for its association with its architect, Richard K.A. Kletting, and with the founder of the Utah Commercial and Savings Bank, Francis Armstrong.

It was listed on the National Register of Historic Places in 1975.

See also

 National Register of Historic Places listings in Salt Lake City

References

External links

 

Bank buildings on the National Register of Historic Places in Utah
Romanesque Revival architecture in Utah
Commercial buildings completed in 1888
Buildings and structures in Salt Lake City
Historic American Buildings Survey in Utah
National Register of Historic Places in Salt Lake City